The USC Alfred E. Mann School of Pharmacy and Pharmaceutical Sciences is the pharmacy school of the University of Southern California, originally established in 1905 as USC College of Pharmacy. On November 17, 2022, the University of Southern California released an announcement  stating that the school will be renamed the USC Alfred E. Mann School of Pharmacy and Pharmaceutical Sciences and will receive a $50 million endowment for student scholarships, faculty recruitment and integrating a university-wide research infrastructure related to biomedical innovation across USC’s University Park and Health Sciences campuses. The School is led by Dean Vassilios Papadopoulos.

Departments

The USC Mann School is organized into four academic departments: 
 Titus Family Department of Clinical Pharmacy
 Department of Pharmacology and Pharmaceutical Sciences
 Department of Pharmaceutical and Health Economics, based at the Leonard D. Schaeffer Center for Health Policy & Economics
 Department of Regulatory and Quality Sciences

Programs of Study

USC Mann School of Pharmacy and Pharmaceutical Sciences currently offers the following programs:

Doctor of Pharmacy Program
 Doctor of Pharmacy (PharmD) 
PhD Programs
 Health Economics (PhD) 
 Regulatory Science (DRSc) 
 Molecular Pharmacology and Toxicology (PhD) 
 Pharmaceutical Sciences (PhD)
 Clinical and Experimental Therapeutics (PhD)

Master's Degree Programs
 Molecular Pharmacology and Toxicology (MS)
 Pharmaceutical Sciences (MS)
 Clinical and Experimental Therapeutics (MS)
 Clinical and Experimental Therapeutics (Progressive MS)
 Pharmaceutical Economics and Policy (MS)
 Health Care Decision Analysis (MS)
 Health Care Decision Analysis (Progressive MS)
 Biopharmaceutical Marketing (MS)
 Biopharmaceutical Marketing (Progressive MS)
 Regulatory Science (MS)
 Management of Drug Development (MS)
 Medical Product Quality
 Regulatory Management (MS)

Undergraduate Degree Programs
 Pharmacology and Drug Development (BS)
 Pharmacology and Drug Development (BA)
 Biopharmaceutical Sciences (BS)
 Biopharmaceutical Sciences (BA)

Undergraduate Minors
 Biopharmaceutical Business
 Foundation in Regulatory Sciences
 Science and Management of Biomedical Therapeutics 

Graduate Certificate Programs
 Six graduate certificates in Regulatory Science

Patient Care Settings

Patient care settings include Keck Hospital of USC, Norris Comprehensive Cancer Center, LAC+USC Medical Center County Hospital, Huntington Hospital, Edward R. Roybal Comprehensive Health Center, and safety-net clinics including JWCH Institute, QueensCare, AltaMed Health Services.

The university owns and operates five pharmacies: USC Pharmacy (University Park Campus), Health Center Pharmacy (University Park Campus), USC Medical Plaza Pharmacy (Health Sciences Campus), USC Verdugo Hills Professional Pharmacy (adjacent to USC Verdugo Hills Hospital) and Keck Medicine of USC Specialty Pharmacy.

History 
In 1905, the USC College of Pharmacy opened, the first in Southern California. In 1918, it created the four-year Bachelor of Science in pharmacy degree program. In 1950, it established the nation's first Doctor of Pharmacy (PharmD) program. The School launched the nation's first PharmD/MBA dual degree in 1990, the first PhD in pharmaceutical economics and policy in 1994, the first professional doctorate in regulatory science in 2008, and a translational science graduate program that merges science with clinical expertise. The USC College of Pharmacy established the nation's first Doctor of Pharmacy (PharmD) program in 1950. Later, in 1968, the school introduced the nation's first clinical pharmacy program, and the first Master of Science in radiopharmacy. In 1974, the school relocated to the USC Health Sciences campus, where students and faculty had access to multidisciplinary medical facilities and the LAC+USC Medical Center. In 1988, USC established the nation's first PharmD/MBA dual degree program, training students in both pharmacy and business administration.

Rankings

In 2016, USC School of Pharmacy was ranked among the top 10 pharmacy schools in the nation by U.S. News & World Report. USC School of Pharmacy was among the top five U.S. schools with the strongest passing rates on the 2015 North American Pharmacist Licensure Examination (NAPLEX). The USC School of Pharmacy class of 2016 had the highest passage rate in California (97.4%)  on the North American Pharmacy Licensing Exam (NAPLEX).

References

External links
 

University of Southern California
Pharmacy schools in California
1905 establishments in California